The Southern Jewish Historical Society is an organization dedicated to preserving the history of Jews in the American South. It was established in 1976 by Saul Viener.  It publishes the journal Southern Jewish History and awards an annual book prize.

References

External links

Jewish organizations based in the United States